Nova Vas is a small village north of Kazlje in the Municipality of Sežana in the Littoral region of Slovenia.

References

External links
Nova Vas on Geopedia

Populated places in the Municipality of Sežana